Miloš Simonović (born 28 May 1990) is a Serbian professional footballer who plays as a centre-back for Radnik Surdulica.

Club career
Born in Zaječar, Simonović started his career with Beograd, where he spent 3 seasons, and scored 4 goals in 68 matches. In the 2011–12 season, Simonović spent with Balkan Mirijevo, and the next season and a half he was with Radnički Obrenovac.

With the beginning of 2014, he joined Serbian First League club Inđija. During the time he spent with Inđija, Simonović usually played as a centre-back, but also appeared as a right-back for some matches. For the 2015–16 season, he joined Napredak Kruševac.

Because of a deficit of defenders, Simonović moved to Radnik Surdulica, on a six month loan from Napredak.

After leaving Napredak in the summer of 2018, he joined Uzbekistan Super League club Sogdiana Jizzakh, but after only half a season, he left Sogdiana and signed a one and a half year contract with Bosnian Premier League club Radnik Bijeljina in February 2019. Simonović made his debut for Radnik on 24 February 2019, in a 1–0 home league win against Željezničar. Even though not a significant one, he won his first trophy, not only with Radnik, but in his entire career on 30 May 2019, the Republika Srpska Cup, after Radnik beat Krupa 3–1 in the final. Simonović left Radnik in July 2020.

On 14 September 2020, he signed with Krupa. Simonović made his official debut for Krupa four days later, on 19 September, in a league match against Željezničar. Only three months after joining Krupa, he terminated his contract with the club on 19 December 2020.

In February 2021, Simonović came back to Radnik Bijeljina. He debuted for the club again in a league game against Velež Mostar on 27 February 2021.

International career
Simonović was called by coach Slavoljub Muslin in the Serbia national team in January 2017.

On 29 January 2017, Simonović made his international debut for Serbia in a friendly match against the United States in a 0–0 away draw in San Diego.

Honours
Radnik Bijeljina
Republika Srpska Cup: 2018–19

References

External links

Miloš Simonović stats at utakmica.rs 

1990 births
Living people
People from Zaječar
Association football defenders
Serbian footballers
Serbia international footballers
FK Beograd players
FK Balkan Mirijevo players
FK Radnički Obrenovac players
FK Inđija players
FK Napredak Kruševac players
FK Radnik Surdulica players
FK Radnik Bijeljina players
FK Krupa players
Serbian First League players
Serbian SuperLiga players
Uzbekistan Super League players
Premier League of Bosnia and Herzegovina players
Serbian expatriate footballers
Expatriate footballers in Uzbekistan
Expatriate footballers in Bosnia and Herzegovina
Serbian expatriate sportspeople in Uzbekistan
Serbian expatriate sportspeople in Bosnia and Herzegovina